MA-7 may refer to:

 
 U.S. Route 7 in Massachusetts
 Mercury-Atlas 7, a spaceflight of Project Mercury
 Militär-Apparat MA-7, Swiss biplane fighter